Billy Soose (August 2, 1915 – September 5, 1998) was an American boxer who won the world middleweight championship in 1941.

Biography
Soose was undefeated in his collegiate boxing career at Penn State and was a three-time Golden Gloves winner before turning professional in 1938.

By the end of his first year in the paid ranks he had beaten the former world champion Eddie Babe Risko although he lost a unanimous decision to  Charley Burley. In 1940 Soose defeated two future middleweight champions, Ken Overlin and Tony Zale. He began 1941 by defeating future heavyweight and light heavyweight title challenger Tami Mauriello. In May of that year he challenged Overlin for the middleweight title at Madison Square Garden and won by a controversial, but unanimous points decision. He made no defences and in November it was reported that he had relinquished the championship in order to pursue the light-heavyweight title.

After losing a bout to light-heavyweight contender Jimmy Bivins in January 1942 Soose joined the United States Navy and retired from professional boxing at the age of twenty-six.

Soose was featured on the cover of the June 1941 Ring magazine and is a member of the World Boxing Hall of Fame. He is also the subject of a book, Billy Soose - The Champion Time Forgot. He was inducted into the International Boxing Hall of Fame in 2009.

Soose was found dead at his home at Tafton, Pennsylvania in 1998.

Professional boxing record

External links

References

1915 births
1998 deaths
People from Farrell, Pennsylvania
Boxers from Pennsylvania

Middleweight boxers
World boxing champions
American male boxers